Anastasiya Dabizha (died 1729), was a Ukrainian Hetmana by marriage to Ivan Skoropadsky, Hetman of Zaporizhian Host (r. 1708–1722).  She acted as the trusted political adviser of her spouse and wielded great influence within the affairs of state, particularly in connection with the foreign policy toward Russia, which was well known and became the subject of a Ukrainian saying.

References

 Мордовцев Д. Л. Женщины первой половины XVIII века // Собрание сочинений. — Т.36. — Спб. 1902. — с. 16, 17, 19.
 Пріцак О. Рід Скоропадських (Історично-генеальогічна студія). — Львів, 1938.
 Гуржій О. «Іван носить плахту, а Настя — булаву». Суспільно-політичний портрет елітної жінки першої половини XVIII ст. // Соціум. Альманах соціальної історії. Випуск 1. — 2002. — с.219—230.
 Лебединська Т. Гетьманша серед «собіратєлєй»
 "Гетьман Іван Скоропадський", Ukrainian Historical Journal. 1999. No. 2
 Анастасия Скоропадская (Маркевич) на Родовид

1729 deaths
18th-century Ukrainian people
People from the Cossack Hetmanate
People of the Great Northern War